Education Equality Project (EEP) is an education reform organization in the U.S. John Legend serves on the group's board. Lisa Graham Keegan is also involved with the group. The group's website now redirects to Stand for Children.

See also
 Achievement gap in the United States
 Black Alliance for Educational Options
 Center for Education Reform
 Democrats for Education Reform

References

External links
 Education Equality Project website

Educational organizations based in the United States